The 2014 SWAC women's basketball tournament took place March 11–15, 2014, at the Toyota Center in Houston, Texas. The tournament champion will receive the Southwestern Athletic Conference's automatic bid to the 2014 NCAA Women's Division I Basketball Championship.

Format
All 10 teams were eligible and able to compete in the 2014 Women's Basketball Tournament, unlike the men's bracket where only 6 teams were eligible until the SWAC adjusted the league's postseason ban. Seeds 1-6 received a bye into the quarterfinals. Rather than use the traditional 10-team scheduling format, where one full day was devoted to men's quarterfinals and the other to the women's quarterfinals, the SWAC decided to protect their top 2-seeds by giving them days off between matches. The tournament began with two quarterfinals on Tuesday featuring 7/10 and 8/9. The winner of these two matches moved on to play the 1 (vs. 8/9) and 2 (vs. 7/10) seeds on Wednesday. The 3 vs. 6 and 4 vs. 5 matches didn't take place until Thursday. The quarterfinal winners would meet in the semifinals on Friday, and the championship game took place Saturday. The championship game aired live on ESPN3 and then aired tape delayed on ESPNU Sunday.

Seeds

Bracket

All times listed are Central

References

External links

SWAC women's basketball tournament
2013–14 Southwestern Athletic Conference women's basketball season